V520 Persei is a blue supergiant member of NGC 869, one of the Perseus Double Cluster open clusters. It is an irregular variable star.

V520 Persei is the brightest member of the Double Cluster at magnitude 6.55.  Two brighter stars in the same field are foreground objects.  7 Persei, sometimes considered to be the actual star χ Persei, is a yellow giant star, and HD 14443 is a white supergiant.  Several other early B supergiants in NGC 869 are the most luminous members of the cluster, while NGC 884 contains several red supergiants.

The Washington Double Star Catalog lists V520 Per as a double star about 15" from a 13th magnitude A0 companion which is another cluster member.  There are dozens of other stars within an arc-minute, including several brighter than 10th magnitude and two 15th magnitude stars closer than the listed companion.  The Catalogue of Components of Double and Multiple Stars also lists a single companion, but it is an 11th magnitude star 29" away.

V520 Per is a well-defined member of NGC 869 by location, proper motion, photometry, and spectroscopy, which places it at the same distance of around 7,000 light years.

The type of variability is listed in the General Catalogue of Variable Stars as IA, indicating it is poorly studied with no clear period.  The visual range is 6.52 - 6.67.  Statistical analysis of Hipparcos photometry suggests a possible period of 1.6 days, but the type variability is not clearly defined.

V520 Persei is a supergiant with a spectral class of B3. It also shows some emission lines in its spectrum.  It has exhausted its core hydrogen and expanded into a more luminous star fusing hydrogen in a shell or helium in its core.  It is over 100,000 times more luminous than the sun, although only thirty times its mass.  Much of the luminosity arises from ultraviolet radiation created by the temperature of over 20,000 K.

V520 Per has been identified as one of Flamsteed's "missing stars", catalogue numbers created by Flamsteed but not actually associated with a current star in that constellation.  It is described as being 61 Andromedae, although it is well outside the boundary of Andromeda and Flamsteed catalogued other nearby stars in Perseus, for example 7 Persei for χ Per itself.

References

B-type supergiants
Perseus (constellation)
Persei, V520
014528
Irregular variables
010805
BD+56 0522
Double stars
Be stars